Jocara nana is a species of snout moth. It is found in Costa Rica.

References

Moths described in 1912
Jocara